Enoch (Ḥănōḵ) is a person in the Book of Genesis. He is described as a son of Cain, and father of Irad.

Narrative 
After Cain arrived in the Land of Nod, to which he was evicted by the Lord as his punishment for murdering his brother Abel, his wife became pregnant and bore Cain's first child, whom he named Enoch. 

This Enoch is not to be confused with Enoch, son of Jared, to whom the authorship of the Book of Enoch is ascribed.

Either Cain built a city and named it after the mighty Enoch, or else Enoch built a city.

According to the Book of Jubilees 4:9, Enoch's mother/aunt was named Awan.

Family tree

References

Book of Genesis people
Cain and Abel
Bereshit (parashah)
City founders
Book of Jubilees